Pharta is a genus of crab spiders, family Thomisidae, first described by Tamerlan Thorell in 1891.

Species
, it contains ten Asian species:
Pharta bimaculata Thorell, 1891 – Malaysia, Singapore
Pharta brevipalpus (Simon, 1903) – China, Vietnam, Japan (Ryukyu Is.)
Pharta gongshan (Yang, Zhu & Song, 2006) – China
Pharta indica Sen, Saha & Raychaudhuri, 2012 – India
Pharta koponeni Benjamin, 2014 – Thailand
Pharta lingxiufengica (Liu, 2022) – China
Pharta nigra (Tang, Griswold & Peng, 2009) – Myanmar
Pharta sudmannorum Benjamin, 2014 – Malaysia (Borneo)
Pharta tangi Wang, Mi & Peng, 2016 – China
Pharta tengchong (Tang, Griswold & Yin, 2009) – China

References

Thomisidae
Thomisidae genera
Spiders of Asia
Taxa named by Tamerlan Thorell